L. M. "Yen" Lightsey was a college football player.

Clemson
Yen Lightsey was a prominent tackle and guard for the Clemson Tigers of Clemson University, selected All-Southern in 1919 and 1920. He was inducted into the Clemson Athletic Hall of Fame in 1976. Lightsey was named to an All-Clemson team from 1869-1935 chosen by the Capitol City Newspaper Sportswriters.

References

Clemson Tigers football players
American football tackles
American football guards
All-Southern college football players